Manríquez (var. Manrique) is a surname. Notable people with the surname include:
 Fernando Manríquez (born 1984), Chilean footballer
 Irma Martínez Manríquez, Mexican politician
  (born 1987), association football player
 Rafael Manríquez (born 1947), Chilean journalist, musician, and producer
 Salomón Manríquez (born 1982), Venezuelan baseball player and coach
 Silvia Manríquez (born 1955), Mexican actress
 Víctor Manuel Manríquez (born 1982), Mexican politician